"Katmandu" is a song written and recorded by American rock artist Bob Seger. It was initially released on his 1975 studio album Beautiful Loser, which became the first of ten consecutive platinum albums for Seger. The song was later featured on his live album Live Bullet. The single edit reached number 43 on the US Top 40, becoming Seger's most successful single since "Ramblin' Gamblin' Man". The song was featured in the soundtracks of the 1985 film Mask, the 16th episode of Freaks and Geeks, the tenth episode of the eighth season of Supernatural, and in the 2009 documentary Journey to Everest.

Content
The song refers to the city Kathmandu, the capital of Nepal, although there is no evidence that Seger visited Kathmandu prior to 1991. After the Nepali earthquake of 2015, Seger said his "heart went out" to the city.

Seger said of the song:

Reception
Cash Box called it "fine, tight, rock and roll," saying the song "is punctuated with classic Chuck Berry-style guitar, down-home rockin' piano and fine vocal stylizing by Bob."

Classic Rock History critic Janey Roberts rated it as Seger's 9th best song.

Chart performance

References

1975 singles
Bob Seger songs
Songs written by Bob Seger
Capitol Records singles
1975 songs
Song recordings produced by Bob Seger